Branč is a village and municipality in the Nitra District in western Slovakia, in the Nitra Region.

History
In historical records the village was first mentioned in 1156.

Geography
The village lies at an altitude of 137 metres and covers an area of 13.808 km². It has a population of about 2,070 people.

Ethnicity
The village is approximately 69% Slovak and 31% Magyar.

Facilities
The village has a public library, DVD rental store and football pitch.

See also
 List of municipalities and towns in Slovakia

References

Genealogical resources

The records for genealogical research are available at the state archive "Statny Archiv in Nitra, Slovakia"

 Roman Catholic church records (births/marriages/deaths): 1704-1945 (parish A)
 Lutheran church records (births/marriages/deaths): 1887-1954 (parish B)

External links

Surnames of living people in Branc

Villages and municipalities in Nitra District